Bowback Mountain is in the Beartooth Mountains in the U.S. state of Montana. The peak is one of the tallest in the Beatooth Mountains, the 11th tallest in Montana (tied with Beartooth Mountain) and is in the Absaroka-Beartooth Wilderness in Custer National Forest.

References

Bowback
Beartooth Mountains
Beartooth